The Yogi Bear Show is an American comedy animated television series and the first entry of the Yogi Bear franchise produced by Hanna-Barbera Productions that centers on the misadventures of forest-dwelling Yogi Bear in Jellystone Park. The show debuted in syndication on January 30, 1961 and ran for 33 episodes until January 6, 1962. Two other segments for the show were Snagglepuss and Yakky Doodle. The show had a two-year production run.

Segments

Yogi Bear

Yogi Bear (voiced by Daws Butler impersonating Art Carney) and Boo-Boo Bear (voiced by Don Messick) reside in Jellystone Park, and often tried to steal picnic baskets while evading Ranger Smith (voiced by Don Messick). Yogi also has a relationship with his girlfriend Cindy Bear (voiced by Julie Bennett).

Snagglepuss

Snagglepuss the Mountain Lion (voiced by Daws Butler impersonating Bert Lahr) tries to make his life hospitable while occasionally evading a hunter named Major Minor (voiced by Don Messick).

Yakky Doodle

Yakky Doodle (voiced by Jimmy Weldon in the style of Donald Duck) is a duck that lives with his best friend Chopper the Bulldog (voiced by Vance Colvig impersonating Wallace Beery). Chopper usually protected Yakky from being eaten by Fibber Fox (voiced by Daws Butler impersonating Shelley Berman) or Alfy Gator (voiced by Daws Butler impersonating Alfred Hitchcock).

Episodes

Broadcast
The Yogi Bear Show premiered on January 30, 1961, on some major city markets, although the show was not broadcast on the same day of the week, or the same time, in every city's affiliation in the United States, Canada, and the United Kingdom. Like The Huckleberry Hound Show, some major city markets picked up the program from independent stations such as WPIX in New York City, KTTV in Los Angeles, KTVU in San Francisco, WGN-TV in Chicago, and KTVT in Dallas. In Canada, the show was split into two networks, with most episodes aired on the CTV Television Network with a few CBC Television networks picking up a few episodes in syndication. In Australia, the show aired on the Nine Network. In the United Kingdom, the show had its premiere on Christmas Day 1962 on ITV in all across England.

Syndication
Only a few locally produced children's shows reran segments of The Yogi Bear Show into the 1970s and into the 1980s. Chicago's WGN-TV rarely picked up segments from The Yogi Bear Show among others on Ray Rayner and his Friends until its cancellation in 1980; and in the United Kingdom, BBC One rarely picked up segments of the show during its "Children's BBC" block in the 1980s.

The Yogi Bear Show along with mixed Yogi Bear segments from The Huckleberry Hound Show returned to television on cable-only Nickelodeon, airing from 1990 until 1993, when it then moved to the then-one-year-old Cartoon Network, along with its sister station Boomerang in 2000. The show aired on Cartoon Network until 2004 because of Boomerang airing the show during the time. From November 26 until November 30, 2020, Yogi Bear segments from both Huckleberry Hound and Yogi Bear shows returned to Boomerang for a four-day Thanksgiving weekend. Along with Huckleberry Hound being aired on the same four days, both Snagglepuss and Yakky Doodle segments were not aired during the period; instead, they were replaced by another Yogi Bear segment to fill the block in separate times.

Characters

Yogi Bear

Yogi Bear (voiced by Daws Butler impersonating Art Carney) and Boo Boo Bear reside in Jellystone Park and often try to steal picnic baskets while evading Ranger Smith (voiced by Don Messick). Yogi also has a relationship with his girlfriend Cindy Bear.

Boo-Boo Bear

Boo-Boo Bear (voiced by Don Messick) is Yogi's diminutive sidekick, who tries, and never succeeds, to warn Yogi that "Mr. Ranger" would not like Yogi to steal picnic baskets. He only wears a blue bowtie.

Ranger Smith

The head ranger, he argues with Yogi stealing picnic baskets. He wears a traditional ranger costume.

Cindy Bear

Cindy Bear (voiced by Julie Bennett) is Yogi Bear's girlfriend. She speaks with a pronounced Southern accent and carries a parasol.

Voice cast
Main voices
 Daws Butler - Yogi Bear, Snagglepuss, Fibber Fox, Alfy Gator, various
 Don Messick - Boo Boo Bear, Ranger Smith, Major Minor, narrator, various
 Julie Bennett - Cindy Bear, various
 Jimmy Weldon - Yakky Doodle
 Vance Colvig - Chopper, various

Additional voices 
 Bea Benaderet
 Mel Blanc
 June Foray
 Jerry Mann
 Jean Vander Pyl
 Hal Smith
 Bill Thompson
 Herb Vigran
 Doug Young

Spin-offs, movies, and specials
Following the show's cancellation in 1962, many spin-off incarnations, feature-length movies, and specials first appeared.

 Hey There, It's Yogi Bear! was released to theaters in 1964 by Columbia Pictures.
 Yogi's Ark Lark is a one-hour special first aired in 1972, in which Yogi and fellow Hanna-Barbera stars go on a journey to find the perfect place. 
 Yogi's Gang, which spun-off from Yogi's Ark Lark, ran for one season on ABC in 1973.
 Laff-A-Lympics  first aired on ABC in 1977.
 Yogi's Space Race, featuring Yogi and friends in an outer space race, aired on NBC in 1978.
 Yogi's First Christmas, a made-for-television movie, premiered in 1980.
 Yogi Bear's All Star Comedy Christmas Caper, a special, first aired in 1982.
 Yogi's Treasure Hunt, first aired in syndication as part of The Funtastic World of Hanna-Barbera in 1985, featured Yogi and pals hunting for lost treasure.
 Yogi's Great Escape, a 1987 television film, is part of Superstars 10.
 Yogi Bear and the Magical Flight of the Spruce Goose, a 1987 television film, is part of Superstars 10. 
 The Good, the Bad, and Huckleberry Hound is a 1988 television film, part of Superstars 10.
 Yogi and the Invasion of the Space Bears is a 1988 television film, part of Superstars 10. 
 The New Yogi Bear Show, a 1988 update of the 1961 original, first aired in syndication. 
 Wake, Rattle, and Roll (Fender Bender 500 segment only) first aired in syndication and later on the Disney Channel in 1990.
 Yo Yogi!, featuring Yogi and the gang as teenagers, first aired on NBC in 1991.
 Yogi the Easter Bear, first aired in 1994, is syndicated. 
 Arabian Nights (Aliyah-Din and the Magic Lamp segment only) first aired on TBS, also in 1994.
 A Day in the Life of Ranger Smith and Boo Boo Runs Wild are two standalone shorts directed by John Kricfalusi.
 Yogi Bear, a live-action/CGI film, was released to theaters in 2010 by Warner Bros.
 Jellystone! is a television web show released on HBO Max in 2021.

Additionally, reruns of the original series were aired on the USA Network from the mid-1980s through the early 1990s as part of their USA Cartoon Express animation block, while Nickelodeon also aired these same episodes, plus Yogi's Gang, Yogi's Space Race, and the latter's spinoff series, Galaxy Goof-Ups, during the early 1990s under the umbrella title Nickelodeon's Most Wanted: Yogi Bear.

Home media
On November 15, 2005, Warner Home Video (via Hanna-Barbera Productions and Warner Bros. Family Entertainment) released the complete series on region 1 DVD. However, the episodes in the R1 H-B Golden Collection Complete Series DVD set were the edited-for-syndication versions, instead of the original, uncut network broadcast masters due to cost issues. A Region 2 DVD was released on January 31, 2011. A Region 4 DVD was released on September 6, 2011.

The earlier Yogi Bear cartoons from the first season of The Huckleberry Hound Show can be found on The Huckleberry Hound Show - Volume 1.

See also
 List of works produced by Hanna-Barbera Productions
 List of films based on Hanna-Barbera cartoons
 List of Hanna-Barbera characters

References

External links

The Cartoon Scrapbook – Profile on Yogi Bear

Yogi Bear television series
1961 American television series debuts
1962 American television series endings
1960s American animated television series
1960s American anthology television series
1960s American comedy television series
American animated television spin-offs
American children's animated anthology television series
American children's animated comedy television series
Television series by Hanna-Barbera
English-language television shows
Television series by Screen Gems
Television series by Sony Pictures Television
Television series by Warner Bros. Television Studios
Animated television series about bears
First-run syndicated television programs in the United States